Mambalapattu is a village in Viluppuram District, in the Indian state of Tamil Nadu. Which is a suburb village of villupuram city. Mambalapet located in the villupuram-tirukoilur highway.

Transport 

A railway station is located in Mambalapattu. Local trains are available 24 hours a day, as well as direct train routes from Viluppuram Junction to Tirupati.

Education 

 Government Higher Secondary School
 Aided Elementary School
 D.M. Elementary 
 Panchayat Union Elementary School
 Mambalapattu Training Facility

Reference

Villages in Viluppuram district
Cities and towns in Tiruvannamalai district